Sangre de Lobos ("Blood of Wolves") was a successful Colombian telenovela produced in 1992 by Producciones JES and aired on Canal A. It was written by Mónica Agudelo and Bernardo Romero Pereiro.

It spawned a Mexican remake in 1998, Tentaciones ("Temptations") produced by TV Azteca. It had to be removed from the air in that country.

External links
Sangre de lobos from Colarte 

1992 telenovelas
Colombian telenovelas
Spanish-language telenovelas